Ferdinand Friedrich Hermann Nielebock (17 April 1888 – 16 July 1954), known as Herms Niel, was a German composer of military songs and marches.

Biography
Upon finishing school in 1902, Niel completed his apprenticeship with the Genthin choirmaster Adolf Büchner. In October 1906, he joined the Imperial German Army and was admitted as a trombonist and oboist in the 1st Infantry Regiment of the Guard (1. Garderegiment zu Fuss) in Potsdam. During the First World War, he was bandmaster of the 423rd German Infantry Regiment. In 1919, he was demobilized and worked as an official in the administration until 1927. That same year, he co-founded in Potsdam the Ritterschaftsorchester (the Knights' Orchestra), where he was composer and lyricist.

After the Nazis  seized power,  Niel, in 1933, joined their party as member 2,171,788. He became a Sturmabteilung troop leader, before receiving a promotion to band leader of the Reichsarbeitsdienst (RAD) training establishment in Potsdam.

During the period of National Socialism, he dedicated himself to composing marches and songs, which were popularized by the NSDAP and widely distributed on all fronts of the Second World War. At the Nazi party rallies in Nuremberg he was the conductor of all RAD music bands.

Niel also invented and designed a fanfare trumpet, known as the Herms Niel-Doppelfanfare, in E and B flat, which was manufactured in 1938 by Ernst Hess Nachf., an accordion factory in Klingenthal.

During the postwar era, Niel lived in Lingen, where he died in 1954.

Works
 "Adlerlied"
 "Antje, mein blondes Kind"
 "Das Engellandlied" (1939), lyrics: Hermann Löns)
 "Die ganze Kompanie"
 "Du Schönste von Städtel, schwarzbraunes Mädel"
 "Es blitzen die stählernen Schwingen"
 "Erika (Auf der Heide blüht ein kleines Blümelein)" (in the 1930s)
 "Es geht ums Vaterland"
 "Es ist so schön, Soldat zu sein, Rosemarie''"
"Es war ein Edelweiß"
 "Edelweißmarsch"
 "Fallschirmjägerlied"
 "Fliegerkuss"
 "Frühmorgens singt die Amsel"
 "Gerda – Ursula – Marie"
 "Hannelore Marschlied"
 "Heut´ sind wir wieder unter uns"
 "Heut’ stechen wir ins blaue Meer"
 "Heute muß ich scheiden"
 "Im Osten pfeift der Wind"
 "In der Heimat steh’n auf Posten"
 "Jawoll, das stimmt, jawoll"
 "Kamerad, wir marschieren gen Westen"
 "Liebchen adé (Annemarie-Polka)" (1934)
 "Liebling, wenn ich traurig bin…"
 "Marie - Mara - Maruschkaka!"
 "Matrosenlied"
 "Mein Bismarckland"
 "Mit Mercedes Benz voran"
 "Rosalinde"
 "Rosemarie (Rosemarie, ich lieb' dich gar so sehr)"
 "Ruck Zuck"
 "Stuka über Afrika"
 "Unsere Flagge"
 "Veronika - Marie"
 "Waltraut ist ein schönes Mädchen"
 "Wenn die Sonne scheint, Annemarie (Die Landpartie)"
 "Tschingta, Tschingta, Bummtara"

References

External links
 Brief biography of Herms Niel 
 Herms Niel in postcards, University of Osnabrück 
 List of songs at Deutscheslied.com 

1888 births
1954 deaths
20th-century trombonists
20th-century German male musicians
German composers
German male composers
German oboists
German trombonists
German military musicians
German Army personnel of World War I
Male oboists
Male trombonists
March musicians
People from Jerichower Land
People from the Province of Saxony
Prussian Army personnel
Sturmabteilung personnel
Reich Labour Service members
German bandleaders